Cultural astronomy, sometimes called the study of Astronomy in Culture, has been described as investigating "the diversity of ways in which cultures, both ancient and modern, perceive celestial objects and integrate them into their view of the world." As such, it encompassed the interdisciplinary fields studying the astronomies of current or ancient societies and cultures. It developed from the two interdisciplinary fields of archaeoastronomy, the study of the use of astronomy and its role in ancient cultures and civilizations, and ethnoastronomy, "a closely allied research field which merges astronomy, textual scholarship, ethnology, and the interpretation of ancient iconography for the purpose of reconstructing lifeways, astronomical techniques, and rituals." It is also related to historical astronomy (analyzing historical astronomical data), history of astronomy (understanding and study and evolution of the discipline of astronomy over the course of human knowledge) and history of astrology (investigating relationships between astrology and astronomy).

Examples

See also
 Archaeoastronomy

References

Astronomical sub-disciplines
History of astrology